Darren Hanlon is an Australian singer-songwriter from Gympie, Queensland. Prior to becoming a solo artist in 1999, Hanlon was a member of Lismore indie rock band The Simpletons, with whom he released four albums and several EPs prior to their 1997 split. Hanlon also contributed backing guitar and keyboards for The Lucksmiths, The Dearhunters, and Mick Thomas. Hanlon describes his style of music as "urban folk," and has been described by Pitchfork as having "distinctive narrative vision" in his music.

Career

Hanlon has released five solo albums, four EPs, and nine singles on Candle Records and Flippin Yeah industries, as well as several compilation tracks. After the dissolving of Candle Records, he has started his own pseudo-label called Flippin Yeah Records in 2008. He self-published his first 'zine in late 2017.

Hanlon is known for his engagement with his audiences, through his down-to-earth storytelling at live gigs. He has toured with the Weather Station, Michael Hurley, Billy Bragg, David Dondero, Tim Kasher, Violent Femmes, The Magnetic Fields, and Courtney Barnett. Described as having "a certain brilliance", Hanlon has also been praised as "a spectacular songwriter; able to create a whole scene from the sum of its subtleties and wit interspersed with poignant moments."

In 2015 Hanlon released his fifth solo album, Where Did You Come From? Songs were recorded in New Orleans, Memphis, Muscle Shoals, Nashville and Clarksdale, with an array of musicians he met along the way, from instrumentalists of popular music Spooner Oldham, David Hood, Howard Grimes, to unknown buskers and street musicians.

Hanlon performs Christmas concerts in December of each year, and has done since 2005. The shows, mostly held in churches and halls, routinely sell out each year.

Discography

Studio albums

Compilation albums

EPs

Zines
Turning his creativity to the written word, Darren Hanlon planned to write a series of stories based on conversations he has with barbers. He self-published his first 11-page zine in late 2017 and is called the Cutting Remarks series.

References

External links
 Darren Hanlon - Official Website
 Flippin Yeah Industries - Official Website

Living people
Australian singer-songwriters
Folk rock musicians
Folk punk musicians
Australian folk musicians
Australian rock guitarists
Australian folk singers
Australian ukulele players
People from Gympie
Year of birth missing (living people)
Yep Roc Records artists
Australian male guitarists
Australian male singer-songwriters
Australian banjoists